James F. "Jim" Allen is the chairman of Hard Rock International and chief executive officer of Seminole Gaming. Previously, he served as vice president of operations of The Trump Organization and senior vice president of Sol Kerzner's company, Sun International.

Early life and education
James Allen was born to Robert C. and Kathryn Allen, and had a modest upbringing. He attended Mainland Regional High School in Linwood, New Jersey, graduating in 1978. To support his mother and aunt, Allen began working in restaurants at the age of 13.

Allen took career-development courses, including gaming classes at University of Nevada, Reno and creative writing and hotel management classes at Atlantic Cape Community College in Mays Landing, New Jersey.

Career
Allen has worked in the casino, hotel, and gaming industries since 1979. His career began as a cook at Bally's Park Place in Atlantic City, New Jersey, where he has been credited with helping successfully implement data tracking software to balance profit and food costs. Via Bally's, he entered a management training program around 1980. In 1985, he joined Atlantic City Hilton as a purchasing manager.

Allen worked at The Trump Organization, which had taken over the Atlantic City Hilton, until 1993. He became part of the senior management team for three Trump properties in Atlantic City, before being promoted to vice president of operations. Allen next worked for real estate developer Christopher Hemmeter (Hemmeter Enterprises), serving as general manager for four Colorado casinos and helping to open another in New Orleans.

He was then hired by South African business magnate Sol Kerzner to serve as the Mohegan Sun's senior vice president of property operations and help develop Atlantis Paradise Island. Allen was Kerzner's third hire, starting in 1995 and departing in 2001. He was promoted to senior vice president of property operations in Kerzner's company, Sun International, which included Mohegan Sun, Atlantis Paradise Island, and the Ocean Club and the former Desert Inn, Las Vegas.

Seminole Gaming and Hard Rock International 
Allen serves as chairman of Hard Rock International (or Seminole Hard Rock Entertainment) and CEO of Seminole Gaming. Allen, who is not of Seminole origin, has led the Seminole Tribe of Florida's gaming operations since 2001. He was initially hired to operate five casinos on the Brighton, Coconut Creek, Hollywood, Immokalee, and Tampa reservations, and to develop the Seminole Hard Rock Hotel and Casino Hollywood and Seminole Hard Rock Hotel and Casino Tampa. Allen is credited with driving the 2003 development of bingo-based "Class II" gaming machines that are similar to slot machines. He has also been credited with leading the tribe's acquisition of Hard Rock International during 2006–2007 and for overseeing its brand, customer experience, image, memorabilia collection, and management practices.

Allen received a casino marketing lifetime achievement award in July 2016, at the Casino Marketing and Technology Conference, which was hosted by Casino Journal and its parent company BNP Media. The award was established in 2004 to recognize individuals who have made "outstanding contributions in the area of casino marketing, promotions and customer service". In March 2017, Allen led the Hard Rock International purchase of the Trump Taj Mahal from investor Carl Icahn. Allen had "played a major role" in opening the hotel and casino, which closed in 2016, and reopened the property as the Hard Rock Hotel & Casino Atlantic City in 2018.

Allen has been credited with the Guitar Hotel expansion of the Seminole Hard Rock Hotel & Casino Hollywood, as well as the guestroom tower expansion of the Seminole Hard Rock Hotel & Casino Tampa. He was honored as a 2020 inductee into the H. Wayne Huizenga College of Business and Entrepreneurship's Entrepreneur and Business Hall of Fame at Nova Southeastern University in Davie, Florida. In 2019, Allen was named a Business Hall of Fame Laureate by Junior Achievement of South Florida.

Personal life
Allen resides in Fort Lauderdale, Florida. He and his former wife, Isabel Allen, divorced in 2019.

In 2005, to commemorate Seminole Gaming's twenty-fifth anniversary, Allen directed a beautification of the tribe's Council Oak, the site of many Seminole Tribe ceremonial events. He serves on the American Gaming Association's board of directors and the advisory board of the Seminole Hard Rock Winterfest Boat Parade. He is also a board member of the Rock and Roll Forever Foundation.

See also
 List of people from Fort Lauderdale, Florida

References

Further reading

External links
 

1960s births
Atlantic Cape Community College alumni
People from Atlantic City, New Jersey
Living people
American chief executives
Hard Rock Cafe
Businesspeople from Fort Lauderdale, Florida
Mainland Regional High School (New Jersey) alumni
People from Linwood, New Jersey
The Trump Organization employees
University of Nevada, Reno alumni